Battery Records may refer to the following record labels:

 Battery Records (hip hop), started by Neil Levine under Zomba Label Group, launched mid-2008 by Sony BMG Music Entertainment
 Battery Records (dance), the dance sublabel of Jive Records, active in the mid-1990s
 Battery Records, associated with Treepeople in 1990